Glazkov culture is an archaeological culture of possibly proto-Tungusic tribes in the Bronze Age (18th-13th centuries BCE), spread in the Baikal area.

The Glazkov culture came to Siberia from the south, displacing Yukagir tribes. Glazkovs is a conditional name for the group of the ancient tribes inhabiting Siberia in the 2nd millennium BCE (Glazkov time) the headwaters of Angara river. Glazkov culture is named after a suburb of the city Irkutsk, where it was first found.

Areal 

Archeologists distinguish in the 2nd millennium BCE Southern Siberia two synchronous independent cultures: Glazkov in the east and the Andronovo culture in the west.

"In the Baikal territory lived a Glazkov group of related tribes, most likely the ancestors of modern Evenks, Evens or Yukagirs. Their culture was very close to the culture of the inhabitants of the upper Amur and Northern Manchuria, and of Mongolia to the Great Wall of China and Ordos Loop. It is possible, hence, that all this extensive area was populated by peoples culturally related with the hunter and fisher tribes of Neolith and Early Bronze... probably speaking related tribal languages". Later the carriers of the southern part Glazkov culture tribes converged with some ancestors of the Huns, and  intermixed with them. In the 18th century BCE the elements of the Andronovo culture seized Minusinsk depression and almost encountered the Glazkovs on the Yenisei. Glazkovs and Andronovs played a secondary role in the 2nd millennium BCE Southern Siberia. Sayano-Altai mountains, Minusinsk depression and Tuva were occupied by Dinlins. Dinlin type "is characterized by the following attributes: average height, frequently tall, a stout and strong constitution, an oblong face, white skin with rosy cheeks, blond hair, a straight protruding nose, frequently eagle-type, light eyes".

Culture 

The elements of Glazkov material culture are stitched birch bark boat, dishes of birch bark and wood, portable cradles, a sawhorse-like contraption for carrying load on the back, composite bow, short strong spear with a massive long tip, three-component divaricating dress that allows to dry by the fire without having to completely undress. Glazkov Tunguses had copper knives, bronze fishing hooks, and ceramics.

Burials

Glazkov burials brought new funeral traditions, the deceased are oriented down river, instead of geographical direction, crouched position, and intentionally broken artifacts, likely to protect the living from the danger presented by a deceased.

The end of the Glazkov time in the southern portion of Baikal eastern area is brought by influx
of people from the Tuva and north-western Mongolia, who brought a distinctive tradition of stone kurgans with fences (chereksurs), which resulted in a formation in the Central Asian steppes of a Slab Grave culture that became an eastern wing of a huge nomadic world in Eurasia, which produced in the beginning of the 1st millennium BCE a bright civilization known as Scythian-Siberian World.

Related cultures

Glazkov culture had clearly expressed variations, bringing about a number of hypotheses about ethno-cultural situation in the Baikal area, all of them concurring that all population groups are of the animal husbandry type. These cultures are Daur, Slab Grave Culture, and Palace Type burials, seen by some researchers as the earliest predecessor of the Slab Grave Culture

Economy 

Hunting, fishery and gathering.

Paleogenetics 

All 4 tested Early Bronze Age individuals from the Ust-Ida burial site belonged to the Y-DNA haplogroup Q-YP4004 under Q1a2.
         
Two earlier Late Neolithic burials from the same area yielded Y-haplogroups Q1a2 and N1c1.

References 
 Glazkov culture (In Russian)
 Ancient history (In Russian)
Debets G.F. "Paleoanthropology of the USSR", Moscow-Leningrad, 1948 (In Russian)
Okladnikov A.P. "Neolith and the Bronze Age of Baikal", Part 3, Moscow-Leningrad, 1955 (In Russian)
  Gumilev L.N., "History of Hun People" (In Russian)

See also 
History of China
History of Kazakhstan
History of Kyrgyzstan
History of Mongolia
History of Russia

Archaeological cultures of Siberia
History of Siberia
Bronze Age cultures of Asia
Archaeological cultures of Northern Europe
Tungusic
Archaeological cultures in Russia